Trimethylolpropane ethoxylate (TPEG) is a trifunctional polyether compound derived from trimethylolpropane.

Production 
TPEG is produced by ethoxylation of trimethylolpropane.

Applications 
TPEG is used in the production of polyurethane foams, elastomers, and sealants.

References 

Polyethers
Polymers